The Rial A. Niles House is a historic house at 605 E. 12th Street in Baxter Springs, Kansas, United States. The house was built in 1870 for Rial A. Niles, a local businessman, and his wife. The house was designed in the Italianate style and features a hip roof with a cupola, a front porch with decorative wooden posts and arches, and four brick chimneys. After Niles went bankrupt, Colonel William March, an officer in the Union Army and two-time Baxter Springs postmaster, bought the house in 1875. March lost the house after his wife's death in 1902, and it passed through a number of tenants until the 1930s. In 1938, the Baxter Springs Women's Club rented the house, which it used for meetings and social gatherings until it disbanded in 1956. The house was then purchased by the local Episcopal congregation and became St. Mark's Episcopal Church until the congregation also disbanded in 1977. The house has since reverted to its previous use as a residence.

The house was added to the National Register of Historic Places on September 6, 2006.

References

Clubhouses on the National Register of Historic Places in Kansas
Episcopal church buildings in Kansas
Houses completed in 1870
Houses on the National Register of Historic Places in Kansas
Houses in Cherokee County, Kansas
Italianate architecture in Kansas
National Register of Historic Places in Cherokee County, Kansas
Women's club buildings